The New Men are a fictional group of characters appearing in American comic books published by Marvel Comics. They are depicted as uplifted animals created by the High Evolutionary.

Publication history
The New Men first appeared in Thor #134 and were created by Stan Lee and Jack Kirby.

Fictional group history
The New Men are the result of Wyndham's first experiments in accelerated evolution. When Wyndham learns that Wundagore Mountain (on which his advanced genetics research citadel was based) is the prison of the powerful demon known as Chthon, he decides to train some of his creations in chivalry and battle tactics so that they can oppose Chthon should he ever return where these elite New Men warriors are called the Knights of Wundagore. The High Evolutionary equips the Knights of Wundagore with advanced weaponry and armor and gives them flying "atomic steeds" on which to ride. He is assisted in this endeavor by the ghost of the 6th century magician named Magnus the Sorcerer.

When the wife of Magneto had died, the High Evolutionary enlisted a New-Man named Bova to watch over Magneto's children Quicksilver and Scarlet Witch

As seen in flashbacks, the New Men become an extended family to Luna Maximoff.

Wyndham later converts his citadel into a spaceship and he and most of his New Men leave to explore the stars. They eventually settle on a planet which they name Wundagore II.

When the Evolutionary learned that the god-like Celestials were coming to Earth to judge whether humanity should continue to exist or perish, he allied with the Evolutionaries in order to eradicate those they've deemed "tainted", fearing that their unnatural presence may cause the Celestials to deem the planet unworthy. He himself began slaughtering systematically his own creations.

When the High Evolutionary's Counter-Earth resurfaced under unknown circumstances, some of the New Men were seen living on it. They are routinely exterminated and recreated by the High Evolutionary when they fail to meet his standards. Some of these New Men "flaws" have taken refuge in Lowtown where they are given shelter by a man called the Low Evolutionary.

Several New Men showed up in Lexington, Kentucky when the High Evolutionary plotted to sync the vibration frequencies of Earth and Counter-Earth so that he can combine them.

During the "Hunted" storyline, Kraven the Hunter hunted some New Men in order to draw out the High Evolutionary. Kraven cuts a deal with the High Evolutionary to take his DNA sample and create 87 clones of him in order for them to go out into the world and prove themselves to Kraven. The High Evolutionary agrees to the terms.

Members
Known New Men have included:

 Ani-Men III - This incarnation of the Ani-Men was created by the High Evolutionary.
 Buzzard - An uplifted hawk.
 Crushtacean - An uplifted crab.
 Flying Fox - An uplifted bat.
 Komodo - An uplifted Komodo dragon.
 Spinneret - An uplifted spider.
 Ani-Mutants - A group of New Men who the High Evolutionary cast aside in favor of the Godpack. They became followers of Man-Beast.
 Simbus - An uplifted lion and an ally of Man-Beast. Although Simbus was first seen with an orange mane, it changed to purple when he sided with Man-Beast.
 Tantaro - Tantaro is an uplifted elephant from the Bronx Zoo.
 Urson-Wellz - Urson-Wellz is an uplifted bear from the Bronx Zoo. The High Evolutionary admitted he had a sense of humor and suggested it was the reason to name this New Man after movie star Orson Welles.
 Barber - An unnamed uplifted mouse that works as a barber. After Thor shaved his beard, the barber gave the shaving bowl containing Thor's blood and hair to Count Tagar which the High Evolutionary later used to create Nobilus.
 Bova - An uplifted Guernsey cattle who serves as the foster mother to Pietro Maximoff and Wanda Maximoff. She was also used by the High Evolutionary to raise and nurture the young New Men as their nanny.
 Caninus - An uplifted dog.
 Dempsey - A dalmatian who was the High Evolutionary's first creation. He was killed by some poachers and his body was taken away by the High Evolutionary.
 Dicero - A young uplifted black rhinoceros and a student of Prosimia and Lady Bova.
 Drhovo - An unspecified uplifted amphibian that is one of the High Evolutionary's bodyguards.
 Eaglus - An uplifted eagle.
 Equius - An uplifted horse.
 Felinatus - An uplifted cat.
 Gorr - An uplifted golden gorilla, Gorr first appears in Fantastic Four #171. He acts as the High Evolutionary's valet.
 Inheritor - An uplifted bladehandle cockroach. Inheritor rebels against the High Evolutionary. During a battle with Hulk, he is returned to his original form.
 Ja'Rue - An uplifted cheetah.
 Kingii - Kingii is an uplifted frill-necked lizard who was created by the High Evolutionary and then experimented upon by Man-Beast. He was devolved by the High Evolutionary.
 Kohbra - An uplifted snake that resides on Counter-Earth.
 Knights of Wundagore - The Knights of Wundagore are a group of elite New Men warriors who were trained by the High Evolutionary to prepare for the return of Chthon. Each of its members were advanced armors and ride "Atomic Steeds" which the High Evolutionary constructed with help from the ghost of Magnus.
 Count Tagar - An uplifted tiger created on Counter-Earth, Tagar first appears in Thor #133 (Oct 1966). He rebels against the High Evolutionary.
 Lady Ursula - Lady Ursula is an uplifted brown bear who is boisterous and vicious. She proves to be just when she commits suicide rather than allow the Man-Beast to enslave her.
 Lady Vermin - Lady Vermin is an uplifted rat who uses a small jetpack to get around.
 Lord Anon (formerly Sir Wulf) - Lord Anon is an uplifted red wolf. He is killed by Man-Beast.
 Lord Byson - Lord Byson is an uplifted bison. Even though it was stated that he was evolved from a bison, Lord Byson had the appearance of a cape buffalo.
 Lord Churchill - Lord Churchill is an uplifted bulldog who is honorable, loyal, and clever. He is killed by Man-Beast.
 Lord Gator - Lord Gator is an uplifted alligator who is quiet and mysterious striking only when foes least expect it.
 Lord Tyger - Lord Tyger is an uplifted tiger who is scholarly and wise. He is paradoxically just as decadent as any civilized person. Lord Tyger is the leader of the Knights of Wundagore.
 Sir Delphis - Sir Delphis is an uplifted dolphin who is an inquisitive character that thinks through his plans before acting. He later left the team.
 Sir Gote - An uplifted goat.
 Sir Hogg - An unidentified uplifted pig.
 Sir Lepard - Sir Lepard is an uplifted leopard. He dies during a battle with the Rigellians.
 Sir Lepard II - A second character with this name and successor to the original Sir Lepard.
 Sir Lyan - Sir Lyan is an uplifted lion. He is the second-in-command of the Knights of Wundagore.
 Sir Ossilot - Sir Ossilot is an uplifted ocelot. He dies during a battle with the Rigellians.
 Sir Panther - Sir Panther is an uplifted panther.
 Sir Porga - Sir Porga is an uplifted pig. He is killed by his fellow New Men when they started to give in to their animalistic natures.
 Sir Ram - An uplifted ram who is noble and knightly. He is pledged in faith to his lord and master. He is killed when the ship he was on with Bruce Banner was hit with radiation.
 Sir Ram II - A second character with this name that was the successor of the original Sir Ram.
 Sir Steed - Steed is an uplifted horse. He jumps in front of a blast intended to kill Luna.
 Sir Ursus - An uplifted bear
 Snow Queen - Snow Queen is an uplifted white tigress who is the sister of White Tiger. She appears in chapter 2 of X-Men: Endangered Species where she fights Beast when he tries to enter Wungadore without permission.
 Kohbra - An uplifted snake.
 Lady Shadra - An uplifted black panther who is one of the High Evolutionary's first New Men. She is known for training Count Tagar and Sir Ram. Her legend is first told in Wolverine: First Class #3.
 Man-Beast - Man-Beast is an uplifted red wolf that has developed vast mental powers. He schemes to destroy humanity and the High Evolutionary, but he is eventually devolved back into a red wolf with the help of Quicksilver. He first appears in Thor #134 (Nov 1966).
 Man-Beast's Followers - A group of New Men that are on Man-Beast's side.
 Barachuudar - An uplifted fish who works for Man-Beast as one of his presidential aides on Counter-Earth.
 Cobrah - An uplifted cobra who works for Man-Beast as one of his presidential aides on Counter-Earth. He is not to be confused with Kohbra.
 Haukk - An uplifted hawk.
 Lizhardus - An uplifted lizard.
 Monck - An uplifted gibbon.
 Pih-Junn - An uplifted pigeon who was partnered with Haukk.
 Snakar - An uplifted snake who works for Man-Beast as one of the presidential aides on Counter-Earth.
 Triax the Terrible - Triax is an uplifted common warthog who is a follower of Man-Beast.
 Weezhil - An uplifted weasel who works for Man-Beast as one of his presidential aides on Counter-Earth.
 Mongoose - An uplifted mongoose possesses super strength, speed, agility and reflexes. He is a former member of the Thunderbolts.
 Mynos - An uplifted cattle that works for the New Immortals.
 Porcunis - An uplifted porcupine.
 Prosimia - Prosimia is an uplifted ring-tailed lemur and storyteller. He sacrifices his life to protect Kitty Pryde from Man-Beast's attack.
 Squire Gulo - Gulo is an uplifted wolverine who is trained by Lady Shandra. His legend is first told in Wolverine: First Class #3.
 Tabur - Tabur was an uplifted cat. He is at one point the leader of the Cat People. Agatha Harkness casts a spell on him while he is fighting Tigra and he is reverted into a cat.
 White Tiger - White Tiger was an uplifted white tigress created to hunt down Man-Beast. She returns to her animal form following Man-Beast's defeat. White Tiger was later revealed to have a sister named Snow Queen.

In other media
The New Men appear in the X-Men episode "Family Ties". Besides Lady Bova, other New Men featured are a goat, a lion, a rhinoceros, a deer, a panda, a zebra, some musk oxen, a snow leopard, and a warthog amongst others. Lady Bova is the foster mother of Quicksilver and Scarlet Witch before giving them to a man named Django and his wife to look after. Years later, Quicksilver and Scarlet Witch come to Wundagore to look for her. After a DNA match, the High Evolutionary takes them to see her. She is the one who told them that Magneto is their father. Some of the New Men are sent to trap Magneto only to also trap Scarlet Witch, Quicksilver, and Wolverine. Following the battle with the X-Men, Magneto, Quicksilver, and Scarlet Witch, the New Men manage to escape with the High Evolutionary.

The New Men appear in Spider-Man Unlimited. In this series, the High Evolutionary's New Men and other creations that reside on Counter-Earth are called "Bestials." Within the series, the Beastials are the dominant species of Counter-Earth while the humans are a second-class minority. Sir Ram (voiced by Ron Halder), Sir Tyger (voiced by David Sobolov), Lady Ursula (voiced by Tasha Simms), and Lady Vermin (voiced by Jennifer Hale) are the only members of the New Men that appear retaining their title of "Knights of Wundagore". The Knights of Wundagore are assisted by the Machine Men.

References

External links
 New Men at Marvel Wiki
 New Men at Comic Vine
 
 
 

Fictional organizations in Marvel Comics
Fictional genetically engineered characters
Transians